Giles Mutsekwa (14 September 1948 – 27 June 2022) was a Zimbabwean politician. He was appointed to the unity government as one of two co-ministers of Home Affairs by Prime Minister Morgan Tsvangirai in February 2009 and sworn into office on 13 February. He concurrently served as secretary for Security and Intelligence of the MDC-T, and served as MP for Mutare North from 2000 to 2008. In 2010, he was reassigned and became Minister for Housing.

Background 

Earlier in his political career, he was a member of Zimbabwe Unity Movement and the Manicaland Provincial Chairman. He also joined The Democratic Party and was a founder member and National Chairman. He was also a trained soldier with various military awards, which include General Service Medal – Bronze Cross of Zimbabwe. He has held several posts in the army including the post of Officer CADET (UK) 1978–1979 and in 1983 he was promoted to the rank of captain. He also participated in the Military campaigns of Mozambique between 1982–86. He was one of the most senior MDC T members in Manicaland.

References 

1948 births
2022 deaths
Zimbabwean military personnel
Movement for Democratic Change – Tsvangirai politicians
Government ministers of Zimbabwe
People from Mutare